The WAGR E class was a two-member class of 2-4-4-2T double-Fairlie locomotives operated by the Western Australian Government Railways (WAGR) between 1881 and 1892.

History
The E class engines were built by Avonside Engine Co, Bristol in 1879 for the WAGR's Northampton railway line, the first government railway in Western Australia, which opened that year.

In line with Avonside's practice for assigning build numbers to Fairlie locomotives, each end received a separate serial number. However, after a collapse in the price of lead, the heavy mineral traffic for which they were purchased dried up and they were placed in store. One entered service in 1881, with the second remaining in store until 1885 when a M class had to be withdrawn for overhaul. When engine class designations were introduced in 1885 and became the E class, numbered E20 and E7.

In 1888, both were transferred to Fremantle Railway Workshops for use on the Eastern Railway. In 1891, E20 was cut up with the parts from one half with adapted to drive machinery at the Fremantle Railway Workshops, the other half was converted into a 2-4-2T tank engine as F20 in February 1893 for use at Fremantle Long Jetty. It was sold in February 1899 to Jarrah Timber & Wood Paving, Worsley and withdrawn by March 1905.

E7 was withdrawn in 1895 and sold to the Canning Jarrah Timber Company for use on the Upper Darling Range Railway. It was scrapped in 1897.

Namesakes
The E class designation was reused for the E class locomotives that were introduced in 1902. It was reused again in the 1960s when an E class diesel locomotive was acquired.

See also

History of rail transport in Western Australia
List of Western Australian locomotive classes

References

Notes

Cited works

External links

Avonside locomotives
Fairlie locomotives
Railway locomotives introduced in 1881
E WAGR class (1879)
2-4-4-2T locomotives
3 ft 6 in gauge locomotives of Australia
Scrapped locomotives
Freight locomotives